Following is a list of senators of Indre, people who have represented the department of Indre in the Senate of France.

Third Republic

Senators for Indre under the French Third Republic were:

 François-Marie Taillepied (Bondy) (1876–1890)
 Léon Clément (1876–1894)
 Paul-Antoine Bénazet (1891–1897)
 Arthur Brunet (1891–1900)
 Antony Ratier (1894–1933)
 Alfred Moroux (1897–1906)
 Émile Forichon, (1900–1915)
 Joseph Leglos (1906–1924)
 Henri Cosnier (1920–1932)
 Henry Dauthy (1924–1939)
 Paul Bénazet (1933–1940)
 Fernand Gautier (1933–1940)

Fourth Republic

Senators for Indre under the French Fourth Republic were:

 Vincent Rotinat (1946–1959)
 Anatole Ferrant (1948–1955)
 René Caillaud (1955–1958)

Fifth Republic 
Senators for Indre under the French Fifth Republic:

References

Sources

 
Lists of members of the Senate (France) by department